Chhani Bari is a village in the Hanumangarh district of Rajasthan state in India.
It is in the Bhadra mandal and is a sub-tehsil in Bhadra Tehsil. Chhani Bari is situated at a distance of about 18.7km from its mandal headquarters Bhadra, 148 km from the district headquarters of Hanumangarh and 336 km away from the state capital of Jaipur. Hisar is the closest commercial center.

Transportation 
Chhani Bari can be reached by a number of bus routes. Some long route buses start from Chhani Bari for Jaipur and Hanumangarh. The village has become a small commercial hub in the nearby area after Bhadra because of internal markets being developed. 

Due to the village's large population of over 1000 homes, there are three bus stops: Tehsil, Village Center and Main Bus Stand.

There is an Army Radar in the village. Many telecommunication companies have installed towers across the town.

Language 
The official language of Chhani Bari is Hindu, but the regional language in Chhani Bari is Bagri. Chhani Bari is home to a wide array of accents not native to the village.

Agriculture 
Crops like wheat, cotton, and vegetables are grown on the farms. To assist with farming, a canal handles the irrigation supply
  In Chhani Bari here a manufacturer unit of biomass briquettes which are made from mustard husk and name of manufacturer unit is SRP GREENTECH which is located between Sarswati school to Chanduram college distance from village is less than 1km

Location 
The village is located on the Bhadra-Mandi Adampur route in the Hanumangarh district of Rajasthan state in India. Chhani Bari is situated at a distance of about 18.7 km from its mandal headquarters Bhadra, 148 km from the district headquarters of Hanumangarh and 336 km away from the state capital of Jaipur.

Villages
Some neighbouring villages include; Janana, Jhansal, Biran, Sherda, Bhirani, Sherpura, Chuli kalan, Ninan, Sagra, Ramgadhiya, Swai chhani, Bharun chhani, Garhi Chhani, Bhadra, Ajeet Pura, Mehrana and Ber.

Educational Institutions

Nearby schools include:
 Government Senior Secondary School
 Government Girl's Secondary School 
 Arya Sen. Secondary school
 Bal Bharti Sen. Secondary school
 Dev Public School
 Laxmi Morden Public School
 Saraswati Senior Secondary School
 Bright Children School (English Medium)

Nearby colleges include:
 Jaharveer Goga Ji Girls College
 Chanduram Suthar Memorial
 Sarswati Girl's College
 Suraj Computer Technical Institute
 Rotash Bansakl

References

Villages in Hanumangarh district